Imajin is an American R&B boy band that is known for their hit "Shorty (You Keep Playing With My Mind)" featuring Keith Murray. The group also made a version of this song with (rapper) Mr. Cheeks of the rap group The Lost Boyz. This single peaked at number 25 on the Billboard Hot 100, number 20 on Billboard's Hot R&B/Hip-Hop Songs chart and number 22 in the UK Singles Chart in 1998.

Discography

Albums

Singles

Unreleased singles

 2005 - "Are We Still In Love" [Album: Unreleased Masters]
 2005 - "Can't Forget" (feat. The Game)

As featured artist

Featured tracks

References

[ Billboard chart history for Shorty from 1998]
Village Voice article concerning Shorty

External links
 [   Further information on the album Imajin at Billboard.com]

American contemporary R&B musical groups
American boy bands
Musical groups established in 1998